James McIlroy may refer to:

James McIlroy (athlete) (born 1976), British middle-distance runner
James McIlroy (musician) (born 1977), English heavy metal guitarist
James McIlroy (surgeon) (1879–1968), British surgeon
Jimmy McIlroy (1931–2018), Northern Ireland international footballer

See also
James McElroy (1945–2011), Irish American mobster